Shenkani is a village in the Alagyaz Municipality of the Aragatsotn Province of Armenia. The town is mostly populated by Yazidis.

References 

Kiesling, Rediscovering Armenia, p. 22, available online at the US embassy to Armenia's website

Populated places in Aragatsotn Province
Yazidi populated places in Armenia